36 Squadron or 36th Squadron may refer to:

No. 36 Squadron RAF
No. 36 Squadron RAAF

United States
 36th Airlift Squadron
 36th Electronic Warfare Squadron, 36th Bombardment Squadron during World War II
 36th Fighter Squadron
 36th Intelligence Squadron
 36th Reconnaissance Squadron (Heavy)
 36th Rescue Squadron

See also
 36th Wing